"The Running Free" is a song by American progressive rock band Coheed and Cambria. The song was released as the lead single from the band's fourth studio album Good Apollo, I'm Burning Star IV, Volume Two: No World for Tomorrow.

Track listing
Promo single

7" single

Personnel
Coheed and Cambria
Claudio Sanchez – vocals, rhythm guitar, keyboards, synths
Travis Stever – lead guitar
Michael Todd – bass

Session musicians
Taylor Hawkins – drums

Additional musicians
Rami Jaffee – synths

Charts

In popular culture 
The song was featured on the soundtrack of NHL 09.

References

External links
Official Music Video on YouTube

2007 songs
2007 singles
Columbia Records singles
Song recordings produced by Nick Raskulinecz
Songs written by Sam Hollander
Songs written by Dave Katz
Songs written by Claudio Sanchez